Upton Broad and Marshes is a  biological Site of Special Scientific Interest east of Norwich in Norfolk. It is part of the Broadland Ramsar site and Special Protection Area, and The Broads Special Area of Conservation.

This is described by Natural England as "an outstanding example of unreclaimed wetland and grazing marsh". Its rich invertebrate fauna includes eighteen species of freshwater snail, and an outstanding variety of dragonflies and damselflies, including the nationally rare Norfolk hawker.

The site is open to the public.

References

Norfolk Wildlife Trust
Sites of Special Scientific Interest in Norfolk
Nature Conservation Review sites
Ramsar sites in England
Special Protection Areas in England
Special Areas of Conservation in England